The Manila Adventist College or MAC (formerly known as Manila Adventist Medical Center and Colleges, Inc. or MAMC) is a private coeducational Christian tertiary health sciences institution. The campus is located inside the campus of Adventist Medical Center Manila within the city of Pasay, Metro Manila, Philippines and is run by the hospital. Both the colleges and hospital are run by the Seventh-day Adventist Church of the Philippines.

It is a part of the Seventh-day Adventist education system, the world's second largest Christian school system.

History 
The colleges were first established as a school in 1993. It was incorporated with its parent hospital, the Manila Sanitarium Hospital, upon its establishment, thus adding the hospital name with a “school of medical arts” (SMA).

In its opening year, the college offered five vocational and allied health courses: three-year Associate in Radiologic Technology, two-year Midwifery, two-year Physical Therapy technician, one-year courses in Nursing Assistant and Emergency Medicine Technician.

After a year, the college wished to upgrade its Physical Therapy Technician and the Associate in Radiologic Technician into a five-year and four-year Bachelor's degree. The college wrote to the Commission on Higher Education (CHED) asking for the authority to implement the upgrade, which was agreed on, and the upgraded courses were offered in school year 1995-6.

In 1995, the college expanded its grounds by constructing a three-storey building with a capacity of six classrooms, five laboratory rooms and two offices. The building was finished in 1996.

In 2000 the college introduced two new programs: the six-month Caregiver Program and the four-year B.S. in Nursing degree. The hospital and school were renamed from Manila Sanitarium Hospital to Manila Adventist Medical Center in 2002 and from School of Medical arts to Colleges in 2007.

In 2019, the School of Law and Jurisprudence commenced operations. This is the first Adventist law school in the Philippines.

Courses offered
School of Business
Bachelor of Science in Accountancy
Bachelor of Science in Business Administration 
Major in Financial Management
Major in Marketing Management
School of Nursing
Bachelor of Science in Nursing
School of Allied Health
Bachelor of Science in Midwifery
Diploma in Midwifery
Bachelor of Science in Pharmacy
Bachelor of Science in Physical Therapy
Bachelor of Science in Radiologic Technology
Bachelor of Medical Laboratory Sciences
School of Law and Jurisprudence
Doctor of Jurisprudence
Senior High School
Academic
Accountancy, Business & Management
Humanities & Social Sciences
Science, Technology, Engineering & Mathematics

See also

 List of Seventh-day Adventist colleges and universities
 Seventh-day Adventist education

References

External links 
 Adventist Medical Center Manila

Universities and colleges affiliated with the Seventh-day Adventist Church
Universities and colleges in Metro Manila
Education in Pasay
Educational institutions established in 1993
Adventist universities and colleges in the Philippines
Nursing schools in the Philippines
1993 establishments in the Philippines